KJJS (103.9 FM "La Rancherita 103.9") is a radio station that serves the Laredo, Texas market, in rural Zapata County, Texas, United States. Its transmitter is located in Zapata, Texas and broadcasts regional Mexican music with a power of 4.5 kW. The station's signal does not reach Laredo, Texas because the signal is too weak.

KJJS is owned by Hispanic Target Media Inc.

References

External links

JJS
Radio stations established in 2005
2005 establishments in Texas